Pegah Khozestan Football Club was an Iranian football club based in Ahvaz, Iran. They  competed in the Iran Football's 2nd Division 2004/05.

Football clubs in Iran